Charles Nephi Watkins (1855–1896) was the second principal of Bannock Academy, the institution that is today Brigham Young University–Idaho.  

Watkins was born in England.  As a child, his family moved to New York City and St. Louis, Missouri. His father died in St. Louis; after his mother remarried, the family moved to Bear Lake County, Idaho in the early 1870s. In 1884, Watkins married Emily Horsley in the Logan Utah Temple. He served as principal of Bannock Academy from 1891 to 1894 and remained a teacher there until his death.

Sources
BYU-Idaho bio of Watkins

1855 births
English Latter Day Saints
English emigrants to the United States
Presidents of Brigham Young University–Idaho
1896 deaths